Głogowiec or Głogówiec may refer to the following places:
Głogowiec, Kutno County in Łódź Voivodeship (central Poland)
Głogowiec, Łęczyca County in Łódź Voivodeship (central Poland)
Głogowiec, Łódź East County in Łódź Voivodeship (central Poland)
Głogowiec, Poddębice County in Łódź Voivodeship (central Poland)
Głogowiec, Subcarpathian Voivodeship (south-east Poland)
Głogówiec, Kuyavian-Pomeranian Voivodeship (north-central Poland)